Haengju Eun clan is a Korean clan. Their Bon-gwan is in Goyang, Gyeonggi Province. , clan has a membership of 12241.

See also 
 Korean clan names of foreign origin

References

External links 
 

 
Eun clans
Korean clan names of Chinese origin